The Montreal Comiccon (French: Le Comiccon de Montréal), under its current form, was launched in 2006 as "Montreal Comic-Con". The event features comic books, toys, games, science-fiction, horror, anime, non-sport cards and collectibles. It is held 2 times a year at the Palais des Congrès convention center in downtown Montreal, with the larger "Comic-Con" taking place in July over the course of 3 days. The same organizers also hold and a smaller one or two-day "Mini-Con", traditionally held at the end of the fall season, in early December.

Special guests, artists, exhibitors and special contests make the Comiccon suitable for children and adults. The September 2012 edition featured guests such as William Shatner (Star Trek), Patrick Stewart (Star Trek: The Next Generation), Malcolm McDowell ("A Clockwork Orange"), James Marsters (Buffy the Vampire Slayer) and other special guests.

The Montreal Comiccon is a fan convention with multi-genre content, with focus on comics, sci-fi, horror, anime and games. While sharing common traits with San Diego's Comic-Con International, the Montreal Comiccon differentiates itself by offering a variety of attractions catering to both the anglophone and francophone population markets of Montreal, and bridging the gap between American comics and European bande dessinée with cross-border and overseas guests and attractions.

Programming
As with most other comics conventions, the Montreal Comiccon offers a select range of activities, exhibits, and other attractions. Comiccon's large exhibit hall on the second floor includes Artist Alley, a Retailers section, an Autograph Area, Photo Ops booth and several exhibits. Most of the scheduled events take place on the convention center's upper floors: on the fifth and seventh floors.

Fans are encouraged to come dressed as their favourite pop culture characters, be they from movies, TV, video games or comics. This is commonly referred to as cosplay. It culminates at the Masquerade, the big costuming competition that brings in judges from across the globe, over 60 competitors, and close to 3000 fans to cheer them on when they hit the big stage.

Over the course of three days, fans are treated to over 100 different panel discussions and workshops that help further promote comics, costuming, gaming and pop culture in general. A gaming zone for fans to discover new game demos, participate in tourneys or simply enjoy some free-play. Video games are feature for both indie games and AAA studios with demos. Screenings for short and feature films are presented that include fans films, as well as independent and studio productions.

Celebrity guests will usually participate in three activities: Autograph sessions, Photo Ops and a Q&A/panel.

History

The Montreal Comiccon held its first edition in 2006 at the Place Bonaventure exhibition center. In 2009, the event re-branded as a pop culture event, adding guests from comic books, anime voice acting, and genre television and film. From 2006 to 2010, the Comiccon was held in room 200-N, a low-ceiling windowless exhibition hall beneath the main hall. Due to 2010's outstanding success, the 2011 show was moved to Place Bonaventure's main hall to accommodate the increased attendance, giving them about three times more space to move around.

The 2012 Montreal Comiccon was held on the weekend of September 14–16, 2012. Due to unexpected demand from the 2011 event, the Montreal Comiccon expanded to a full three days in 2012. The Comiccon also changed venue in 2012, from Place Bonaventure to newer and larger convention facilities at the Palais des congrès de Montréal.

The Canadian Comic Book Creator Awards Organization agreed in principle with the organizers of the Montreal Comiccon and presented the 8th Annual Joe Shuster Awards in conjunction with the event on the evening of Saturday, September 15, 2012.

Due to growing attendance rates, the 2015 was held in July instead of September in order to use the entire floor space of the Palais des congrès.

The organizers run a smaller 1-day convention in December called the "Mini-Comiccon". The 2012 Mini-Comiccon was held on Saturday, December 8 at the Palais des Congrès in Montreal. It offered smaller selections of guests, dealers and artists, but offered at the same time more opportunities throughout the year for fans to purchase comics, meet celebrities and wear costumes, among other things. The admission prices were also lower. The organizational structure remained the same as the main September 3-day edition, but with slightly less staff and volunteers. As of 2015, the December has been free admission. In 2016 it expanded to two days.

In 2020, due to the COVID-19 pandemic in Montreal, the Montreal Comiccon was cancelled for the first time.

Dates and locations
Note: Only September/July editions are shown here.

See also

 List of comic book conventions
 Otakuthon, Montreal's anime convention
 Fan Expo Canada in Toronto, Ontario, Canada's largest multigenre convention
 Ottawa Comiccon in Ottawa, Ontario

References

External links
Official sites
 Montreal Comiccon official website
 Montreal Comiccon on Facebook
 Montreal Comiccon on Twitter

Media articles
 Montreal Comiccon 2011 report at UysFaber
 Article on Comiccon 2010 in the Montreal Mirror (2nd article of the page)
 Article on Comiccon 2010 on Canoë Divertissement

Comics conventions in Canada
Events in Montreal